Banjica is a Serbo-Croatian place name, meaning "small spa". It may refer to:
Banjica, Belgrade, Serbia
Banjica forest, Serbia
Banjica, Čačak, Serbia
Dolna Banjica, North Macedonia
Banjica, Čaška, a village in Čaška Municipality, North Macedonia

See also
Banjica concentration camp
VK Banjica, Serbian water polo club
Banica (disambiguation)

Serbo-Croatian place names